Nilson Julio Tapia (born September 5, 1985) is a Colombian middleweight boxer.  Nilson 's biggest fight was against Gennadiy Golovkin for the regular WBA middleweight title.  In this title fight, Nilson lost by knockout in the third round.

Nilson has defeated fellow Colombian boxer Milton Nunez.

References

External links

!colspan="3" style="background:#C1D8FF;"| Regional Championships
|-

Middleweight boxers
1985 births
Living people
Colombian male boxers
Sportspeople from Chocó Department